Valley of the Wolves: Palestine is a 2011 Turkish action film directed by Zübeyr Şaşmaz and starring Necati Şaşmaz, Nur Fettahoğlu and Erdal Beşikçioğlu. The story revolves around a Turkish commando team which goes to Israel on a rampage of revenge to track down the Israeli military commander responsible for the Gaza flotilla raid. It is part of the Valley of the Wolves media franchise, based on the Turkish television series of the same name, and a sequel to Valley of the Wolves: Iraq (2006) and Valley of the Wolves: Gladio (2008).

Valley of the Wolves: Palestine was criticized for being anti-Israeli and inflammatory.

Synopsis 
After a civilian flotilla attempts to break the Israeli blockade of the Gaza Strip to bring humanitarian assistance and building materials, it is boarded by the Israeli military. Some activists violently resist and are killed by the Israeli soldiers. A Turkish commando team led by Polat Alemdar (Necati Şaşmaz) travels to the West Bank, where they launch a covert campaign against Israeli military personnel in an attempt to track down and eliminate an Israeli general, Moşe Ben Eliyezer (Erdal Beşikçioğlu), who was responsible for the flotilla raid. Polat manages to wound Moshe, who from that moment on goes with an eye patch. After he finds out that the Turkish commando receives support from Palestinian Abdullah, Moshe arrests Abdullah's family and bulldozers their house, with Abdullah's son Ahmet in it. After a fierce urban battle, Polat kills Moshe.

Cast 
 Necati Şaşmaz ... Polat Alemdar
 Nur Fettahoğlu ... Simone Levi (credited as Nur Aysan)
 Erdal Beşikçioğlu ... Moşe Ben Eliyezer
 Gürkan Uygun ... Memati Baş
 Kenan Çoban ... Abdülhey Çoban
 Erkan Sever
 Zafer Diper
 Umut Karadağ
 Mustafa Yaşar

Production 
Pana Film had already settled on the Palestinian territories as the setting of the film and was about to start shooting when the Gaza flotilla raid occurred on 31 May 2010. The existing script was subsequently rewritten to feature the raid as the centre piece of the plot. "This is not about taking revenge for Mavi Marmara", stated producer Zübeyr Şaşmaz. "The goal of the film is to show what the Palestinians are going through." Screenwriter Bahadır Özdener added: "We're calling out to people's conscience. All we want is freedom for innocent and tormented Palestinian people living in inhumane conditions in the world's biggest prison."

The film, which is projected to cost over $20 million, making it one of the most expensive Turkish films, was shot in 11 weeks on location in Adana and Tarsus (Turkey) with a team of 400 people during the summer of 2010. Officials from Pana Film said that these locations were chosen, after scouting several locations in Lebanon, Syria and Bulgaria as well as 20 provinces in Turkey, including Hatay, Elazığ, Şanlıurfa and Gaziantep, due to "the historical texture, the streets and local culture of these places". According to Bünyamın Köselı, writing in Today's Zaman, "approximately 3,000 fans were drawn to the Şehit Kerim neighborhood in Tarsus, where some of the scenes were shot", "which makes the salesmen in the city very happy". Extensive re-shoots were later required after some of the film's action sequences were burned during the lab process.

Release 
The announcement of the film's release came just days after Israel's attack on the Gaza flotilla and according to Emrah Güler, writing in Hürriyet Daily News, "the name of the movie was enough for millions to buy tickets". Technical problems however resulted in the release of the film being postponed until .

Jewish organisations as well as politicians of Turkish descent opposed the film and some tried to ban it.

Controversy 

The film has been called anti-Israeli and anti-Semitic. It was strongly criticized in Germany as anti-Israeli and inciting anti-Semitic sentiments, including the timing chosen for its premiere (Holocaust Remembrance Day).

References

External links 
 

2010s Turkish-language films
2011 action drama films
2011 war drama films
Films set in Turkey
Israel–Turkey relations
Gaza flotilla raid
Israeli–Palestinian conflict films
Turkish action films
Valley of the Wolves
Turkish war drama films
Turkish sequel films
Political action films
Film controversies in Germany
Film controversies in Turkey
Anti-Zionism